Joseph S. "Joe" Leean (born March 10, 1942) is an American businessman and retired Republican politician.  He served as Secretary of the Wisconsin Department of Health and Family Services for seven years under Governor Tommy Thompson and was instrumental in the creation of BadgerCare, Wisconsin's state health insurance program.

Leean subsequently worked as a consultant to Thompson after his appointment as United States Secretary of Health and Human Services.  Earlier in his career, he served ten years in the Wisconsin State Senate, representing the 14th Senate district.

Early life and career
Leean was born in Iola, Wisconsin. He earned his bachelor's degree from Augustana College in 1964 and went on to do graduate studies at the University of Wisconsin–Madison and Western Michigan University.  He worked as a high school math and physics teacher for several years, then became owner and operator of a recreational boating company on the Chain O' Lakes outside Waupaca, Wisconsin.

Political career
Leean was first elected to the Senate in 1984, representing the 14th District, and was re-elected in 1988 and 1992.  Leean was appointed to the influential budget-writing Joint Finance Committee in 1989, and became co-chair of the powerful committee after Republicans secured the Senate majority in 1993.

He resigned from the Senate in July 1995 to accept an appointment as the head of the newly reorganized Department of Health and Family Services (now the Wisconsin Department of Health Services).  He was succeeded in the 14th Senate district by Robert Welch after a September special election.

At the time of his appointment, Governor Thompson said Leean had demonstrated his "diplomacy, skill, and ability" as co-chair of the Joint Finance Committee—where he had to forge consensus with a Democratic co-chair Barbara Linton.  Leean served seven years as head of the Department Health and Family Services under Governor Thompson.  In 2001, Thompson was appointed United States Secretary of Health and Human Services in the George W. Bush administration and Leean was asked to join Thompson as a consultant in Washington, D.C.

Leean retired to Wisconsin after his stint with the Department of Health and Human Services.  He remained active in state politics, however, and was an outspoken supporter of Wisconsin's medicaid program, BadgerCare, and worked with Democratic Governor Jim Doyle's administration to develop a bipartisan state health insurance plan.

Personal life
Leean and his wife, Ginny, lived in Waupaca, Wisconsin.  He is survived by three adult daughters.

References

People from Iola, Wisconsin
Republican Party Wisconsin state senators
University of Wisconsin–Madison alumni
Western Michigan University alumni
State cabinet secretaries of Wisconsin
1942 births
Living people